The Japan national under-20 football team (Japanese: U-20サッカー日本代表) is a national association football team of Japan and is controlled by the Japan Football Association. The year before the FIFA U-20 World Cup, the national team is renamed the Japan national under-19 football team, and the year before that, the national team is renamed the Japan national under-18 football team.

Results and fixtures

Legend

2022

U-19

Fixtures & Results (U-19 2022), JFA.jp

U-18

Fixtures & Results (U-18 2022), JFA.jp

2023

U-20

U-18

High School

Fixtures & Results (U-20 2023), JFA.jp

Coaching staff

Current U-20 coaching staff
.

Current U-18 coaching staff
.

Players

Current U-20 squad
The following players were called up for the 2023 AFC U-20 Asian Cup.

Recent U-20 call-ups
The following players were called up to the squad in the past 12 months.

 INJ

Current U-19 squad
The following players were included in the squad for a Spain Tour, held from 13 to 23 November 2022.

Recent U-19 call-ups
The following players were called up to the squad in the past 12 months.

 INJ
 INJ

Current U-18 squad
The following players were called up for a Training Camp, held from 27 February to 3 March 2023.

Recent U-18 call-ups
The following players were called up to the squad in the past 12 months.

 INJ

Current High School squad
The following High School players (from 2nd to 3rd grade of compulsory education) were included in the 2023 FUJIFILM Super Cup Next Generation Match.

Previous squads
FIFA U-20 World Cup
1979 FIFA World Youth Championship
1995 FIFA World Youth Championship
1997 FIFA World Youth Championship
1999 FIFA World Youth Championship
2001 FIFA World Youth Championship
2003 FIFA World Youth Championship
2005 FIFA World Youth Championship
2007 FIFA U-20 World Cup
2017 FIFA U-20 World Cup
2019 FIFA U-20 World Cup

Records
Players in bold are still active, at least at club level.Caps and goals is calculated by all national team level include U18, U19, and U20.Most capped player

Top goalscorers

Honours
Intercontinental
FIFA U-20 World CupRunners-Up (1): 1999

Continental
AFC U-19 Championship
 Winners (1): 2016Runners-Up (6): 1973, 1994, 1998, 2000, 2002, 2006

Competitive record
FIFA U-20 World Cup*Denotes draws which includes knockout matches decided on penalty shootouts. Red border indicates that the tournament was hosted on home soil. Gold, silver, bronze backgrounds indicate 1st, 2nd and 3rd place finishes respectively. Bold text indicates best finish in tournament.''

AFC U-20 Asian Cup

See also

Japan
Men's
International footballers
National football team (Results (2020–present))
National under-23 football team
National under-20 football team
National under-17 football team
National futsal team
National under-20 futsal team
National beach soccer team
Women's
International footballers
National football team (Results)
National under-20 football team
National under-17 football team
National futsal team

References

External links
 Japan national under-20 football team – official website at JFA.jp 
 Japan national team 2021 schedule at JFA.jp 

Youth football in Japan
Asian national under-20 association football teams
Football